The 150th Boat Race took place on 28 March 2004. Cambridge won by six lengths after a race with several clashes of oars.  Oxford's appeal for a re-row upon the conclusion of the race was rejected by umpire James Behrens.  The event was sponsored for the final time by Aberdeen Asset Management and broadcast in the United Kingdom by the BBC.

In the reserve race Isis beat Goldie; Oxford also won the Women's Boat Race.

Background
The Boat Race is a side-by-side rowing competition between the University of Oxford and the University of Cambridge. First held in 1829, the competition is a  race along the Championship Course on the River Thames in southwest London. The rivalry is a major point of honour between the two universities and followed throughout the United Kingdom and worldwide. The race was sponsored by Aberdeen Asset Management for the fifth and final time. It was also the BBC's 50th anniversary of live broadcast of the event.

The first Women's Boat Race took place in 1927, but did not become an annual fixture until the 1960s. Until 2014, the contest was conducted as part of the Henley Boat Races, but as of the 2015 race, it is held on the River Thames, on the same day as the men's main and reserve races.  The reserve race, contested between Oxford's Isis boat and Cambridge's Goldie boat has been held since 1965.  It usually takes place on the Tideway, prior to the main Boat Race.

Crews

The Oxford crew featured seven Britons and two Americans, while the Cambridge crew consisted of three Britons, a  British/American, a German/French, a German, an American and an Australian.

Race description

Oxford were considered to be pre-race favourites by many.  Cambridge won the coin toss and elected to start from the northern bank (the "Middlesex side") of the Thames.  Conditions were described as "fairly calm".  Oxford made the better start, pulling away to a lead of half a length, but following a number of oar clashes, the Oxford bowman lost his seating, causing his boat to slow.  Cambridge took the lead and with clear water behind them, pulled away to win.  Cambridge finished with a time of 18 minutes, 47 seconds, Oxford finishing six lengths behind. It was Cambridge's first victory since 2001 and brought the overall result to 78–71 in Cambridge's favour.  Oxford's cox Nethercott made an appeal to the umpire but the result stood.  At the finish, following tradition, the Cambridge crew threw their cox, Kenelm Richardson, into the water in celebration.

In the reserve race, Oxford's Isis beat Cambridge's Goldie.  Earlier at Henley, Oxford won the 59th Women's Boat Race by four lengths.

Reaction
Oxford cox Acer Nethercott said "Our bowman came off his seat and could not continue properly – it was race over after that."  Regarding the rejected appeal, he claimed that the umpire "had laid down to both coxes before the race that there was a way he wanted to conduct the race.  And then he did something completely different in the race." Kennelly, the bowman, claimed he was "100 per cent confident that if what happened didn't happen we would have won" while Cambridge cox Kenelm Richardson stated "The umpire was very good and told me to hold my line, so I knew I was exactly where I needed to be".

References

External links
 Official website

The Boat Race
2004 in English sport
2004 in rowing
March 2004 sports events in the United Kingdom
2004 sports events in London